Hamaijan may refer to:
 Hamaijan District
 Hamaijan Rural District